Hornsby Howell (September 3, 1927 – October 3, 2017) was an American football player and coach. He served as the head football coach at North Carolina A&T University from 1968 to 1976, compiling a record of 55–34–4.

In 1982, he was a scout team assistant coach at the University of Georgia, becoming the school's first African-American football coach.

Head coaching record

College

References

External links
 

1927 births
2017 deaths
American football centers
Georgia Bulldogs football coaches
North Carolina A&T Aggies athletic directors
North Carolina A&T Aggies football coaches
North Carolina A&T Aggies football players
North Carolina A&T Aggies men's basketball coaches
Savannah State Tigers and Lady Tigers athletic directors
High school football coaches in South Carolina
People from Greene County, Georgia
Sportspeople from Athens, Georgia
Players of American football from Georgia (U.S. state)
African-American coaches of American football
African-American players of American football
African-American college athletic directors in the United States
20th-century African-American sportspeople
21st-century African-American people